This is a list of monarchs of Bosnia, containing bans and kings of Medieval Bosnia.

Duke (1082–1136)

Bans (1136–1377)

Kings and queen (1377–1463)

All Bosnian kings added the honorific Stephen to their baptismal name upon accession.

| Tvrtko I26 October 1377 – 10 March 1391|||| 1338son of Vladislav Kotromanić and Jelena Šubić || Dorothea of BulgariaIlinci8 December 1374no children || 10 March 1391aged 53
|-
| Dabiša10 March 1391 – 8 September 1395 || || after 1339illegitimate son of Vladislav Kotromanić || Jelena Gruba one daughter || 8 September 1395Kraljeva Sutjeska
|-
| Jelena Gruba8 September 1395 – 1398||  || born to the House of Nikolić || Stephen Dabišaone daughter || after 1399
|-
| Stephen Ostoja1398–14041409–1418 ||  || illegitimate son of Vladislav Kotromanić or Tvrtko I || (1) Vitača no children(2) Kujavaone son(3) Jelena Nelipčićno children || after 23 March 1418
|-
| Stephen Ostojić1418–1420 || || son of Stephen Ostoja and Kujava || never married || 1421
|-
| Tvrtko II1404–1409  1420 – November 1443|| || illegitimate son of Tvrtko I || Dorothy Garaino children|| November 1443
|-
| Radivojanti-king 1432–1435|| || illegitimate son of Stephen Ostoja || Catherine of Velikathree sons|| June 1463
|-
| Stephen Thomas1443 – 10 July 1461 ||  || illegitimate son of Stephen Ostoja || (1) Vojača one son(2) Katarina Kosačatwo children || 10 July 1461
|-
| Stephen Tomašević10 July 1461 – 5 June 1463||  || son of Stephen Thomas and Vojača || Jelena BrankovićSmederevo1 April 1459 no children || 5 June 1463beheaded
|-
|}

Pretenders and titular kings

See also
List of Bosnian consorts
List of dukes of Bosnia
List of grand dukes of Bosnia
High Representative for Bosnia and Herzegovina

References

Sources
 
 
 
 

rulers
 
 
Bosnia